St. Thomas-St. John School District is one of two school districts in the United States Virgin Islands, a territory of the United States.

The district serves the islands of Saint Thomas and Saint John.

Schools

High schools
St. Thomas
 Charlotte Amalie High School (Charlotte Amalie)
 Ivanna Eudora Kean High School (Red Hook)

K-8 schools
St. John 
 Julius E. Sprauve School (Cruz Bay)

Middle schools
St. Thomas
 Bertha C. Boschulte Middle School (Bovoni)
 Addelita Cancryn Junior High School (Charlotte Amalie)

Elementary schools
St. Thomas
 Yvonne E. Milliner Bowsky Elementary School (formerly Peace Corps Elementary School)
 Leonard Dober Elementary School       
 Gladys Abraham Elementary School (Formerly Kirwan Terrace Elementary School)
 Joseph A. Gomez Elementary School (Anna's Retreat)
 Lockhart Elementary School (Charlotte Amalie)
 Ulla F. Muller Elementary School (Charlotte Amalie West)
 E. Benjamin Oliver Elementary School
 Joseph Sibilly Elementary School
 Jane E. Tuitt Elementary School (Charlotte Amalie)

Alternative Academy
Edith Williams Alternative Academy

References

External links
 

 
School districts in the United States Virgin Islands
Saint Thomas, U.S. Virgin Islands
Saint John, U.S. Virgin Islands